Kupšinci (Prekmurje Slovene: Küpšinci) is a village in the Municipality of Murska Sobota in the Prekmurje region of northeastern Slovenia.

There is a Lutheran chapel in the settlement. It was built in the early 20th century in a Neo-Romanesque style with a three-storey belfry.

References

External links

Kupšinci on Geopedia

Populated places in the City Municipality of Murska Sobota